Insomniac Doze is the fourth album from Envy. The album was released in September 2006 by Temporary Residence Limited in the United States, by Rock Action Records in the United Kingdom, and by Sonzai Records in Japan. The sound of Insomniac Doze is characterized as being more epic and atmospheric than what is noted in Envy's previous albums. The album also displays Envy's ability to create a cohesive conglomeration of hardcore punk and screamo alongside melodic post-rock elements.

Track listing

Personnel
Dairoku Seki - drums
Tetsuya Fukagawa - sequencer, vocals
Nobukata Kawai - guitar
Masahiro Tobita - guitar
Manabu Nakagawa - bass guitar
Takashi Kitaguchi - recording, mixing

References

2006 albums
Envy (band) albums
Temporary Residence Limited albums